NetSpot is a software tool for wireless network assessment, scanning, and surveys, analyzing Wi-Fi coverage and performance. It runs on Mac OS X 10.6+ and Windows 7, 8 and 10. Netspot supports 802.11n, 802.11a, 802.11b, and 802.11g wireless networks and uses the standard Wi-Fi network adapter and its Airport interface to map radio signal strength and other wireless network parameters, and build reports on that. NetSpot was released in August 2011.

Functions
NetSpot provides all professional wireless site survey features for Wi-Fi and maps coverage of a living area, office space, buildings, etc. It provides visual data to help analyze radio signal leaks, discover noise sources, map channel use, optimize access point locations. Also, the application can perform Wi-Fi network planning: the data that are collected help to select channels and placements for new hotspots. Survey reports can be generated in PDF format.

Usual uses
 Mapping Wi-Fi
 Mapping Wi-Fi signal strength
 Optimizing networks
 Trouble-shooting networks
 Visualizing wireless networks
 Diagnosing signal problems
 Analyzing wireless network coverage

Release history

See also
 iStumbler – an open-source utility to find wireless networks and devices in Mac OS X
 KisMAC – a wireless network discovery tool for Mac OS X
 WiFi Explorer – a wireless network scanner for Mac OS X

References

External links
 

Site survey